Goh Poh Seng (July 1936 – 10 January 2010) was a Singaporean dramatist, novelist, doctor and poet, was born in Kuala Lumpur, British Malaya in 1936. He was educated at Victoria Institution in Kuala Lumpur, received his medical degree from University College Dublin, and practised medicine in Singapore for twenty-five years.

Writing career
His writing blossomed in Ireland, where he met writers Patrick Kavanagh and Brendan Behan, published his poetry in the university magazine, and took a year off school to write. In his time living in Singapore, Goh held many honorary positions including the Chairman of the National Theatre Trust Board between 1967 and 1972, and Vice-Chairman of the Arts Council from 1967 to 1973. He was committed to the development of Art and cultural policies of post-independent Singapore, as well as the development of cultural institutions such as the Singapore National Symphony, the Chinese Orchestra and the Singapore Dance Company. Goh also opened Singapore's first theatre disco lounge, Rainbow Lounge at Ming Arcade, and Bistro Toulouse-Lautrec at Tanglin Shopping Centre for live jazz and poetry readings, organised Singapore's first David Bowie concert in 1983, and envisioned a livelier Singapore River in the 1970s, a proposal that was only taken seriously decades later.

He was a founder of the literary magazine Tumasek (which lasted for three issues) and co-founded Singapore's first multi-disciplinary arts centre, Centre 65, to promote the arts. Centre 65 inspired the name of Centre 42, an institution for playwriting which opened in 2014.

In 1972, Goh published his first novel, If We Dream Too Long. The novel won the National Book Development Council of Singapore's (NBDCS) Fiction Award in 1976 and has been translated into Russian, Japanese and Tagalog. While the novel was criticised by The Straits Times upon publication, it enjoyed a first print run of 3,000 copies and was considered the first English-language Singaporean novel. It was subsequently has been used as a Literature text in various universities.

His other books include the novels The Immolation (1977) and A Dance of Moths (1995), which received the NBDCS Fiction award in 1996, and poetry collections Eyewitness (1976), Lines from Batu Ferringhi (1978) and Bird With One Wing (1982). Goh's play When the Smiles are Done (1972) was the first to use Singlish on stage, while his debut play The Moon is Less Bright (1964) was revived by Theatreworks (dir. Ong Keng Sen) in 1990 and The Second Breakfast Company (dir. Adeeb Fazah) in 2018.

In 1982, Goh received the Cultural Medallion for his contributions to Literature.

A 15-minute documentary about Goh, directed by Almerinda Travasoss, was released in 2007.

In 2009, Goh announced his plan to write a quartet of novels loosely based on his personal and family history.

In 2014, the Centre for Southeast Asia Research at the University of British Columbia acquired the Goh Poh Seng Collection, a set of 110 volumes from Goh's library.

In 2015, a collection of Goh's short stories based on his adventures in 1950s Ireland, Tall Tales and MisAdventures of a Young Westernized Oriental Gentleman, was posthumously published by NUS Press. The memoir, written in the last years of Goh's life, includes reflections of his formative encounters with Irish literary giants Patrick Kavanagh and Samuel Beckett. Reviewing the book in Quarterly Literary Review Singapore, Zhang Ruihe called it "a valuable addition to Singapore literature, a record of a writer's coming of age in a time of global transition and revolution."

Other career 
In 1983 Goh set up Singapore's first disco and live music venue, Rainbow Lounge, at the Ming Arcade. The venue was shut down by the authorities in 1986 after a complaint was made against it for a indecent remark by a  member of the house band.

Personal life
As a result of the closure of his music venue, Goh emigrated to Canada in 1986. In 2007, Goh returned to Singapore to attend the Singapore Writers Festival. 

Goh died on 10 January 2010 in Vancouver, after suffering from Parkinson's disease in his later years. Paying tribute to Goh, playwright Robert Yeo said, "He is someone who not only believed in literature, but also believed in lifting the cultural aspirations of Singaporeans."

In 2012, his son, Kagan Goh, published Who Let In The Sky?, a family memoir about Goh's struggle with Parkinson's.

Bibliography

Poetry
 Eyewitness (Heinamann Educational Books (Asia) Ltd, 1976)
 Lines from Batu Ferringhi (Island Press, 1978)
 Bird With One Wing (Island Press, 1982) 
 The Girl from Ermita & Selected Poems (Nightwood Editions, 1998) 
 As Though the Gods Love Us (Nightwood Editions,2000)

Novels
 If We Dream Too Long (Island Press, 1972; Heinamann Asia Ltd, 1994; NUS Press, 2010) 
 The Immolation (Heinamann Educational Books (Asia) Ltd., 1977; Epigram Books, 2011) 
 A Dance of Moths (Select Books, 1995) 
 Dance With White Clouds: A Fable for Grown Ups (Asia 2000, 2001)

Plays
 The Moon Is Less Bright (Singapore, 1964, 1990, 2018)
 When Smiles Are Done (Singapore, 1966; retitled Room With Paper Flowers Kuala Lumpur, Malaysia, 1969)
 The Elder Brother (Singapore, 1967)

Short Stories
Tall Tales and MisAdventures of a Young Westernized Oriental Gentleman (NUS Press, 2015)

Autobiographical Essays
 ‘A Star-Lovely Art’, in Vol 10 No. 1 2010 issue of Moving Worlds: A Journal of Transcultural Writing, University of Leeds

Awards 
 National Book Development Council Of Singapore Fiction Award, 1976
 National Book Development Council Of Singapore Fiction Award, 1996
 Cultural Medallion for Literature, 1982

References

External links 

 
 National Archives of Singapore Interview with Goh Poh Seng

1936 births
2010 deaths
Alumni of University College Dublin
20th-century Canadian poets
Canadian male poets
21st-century Canadian poets
20th-century Canadian novelists
21st-century Canadian novelists
20th-century Canadian physicians
Malaysian people of Chinese descent
Malaysian emigrants to Singapore
People who lost Malaysian citizenship
Musicians from Vancouver
Naturalised citizens of Singapore
Naturalized citizens of Canada
Recipients of the Cultural Medallion for literature
People from Kuala Lumpur
Singaporean emigrants to Canada
Singaporean people of Chinese descent
20th-century Singaporean physicians
Singaporean poets
Singaporean novelists
Singaporean dramatists and playwrights
Writers from Vancouver
Canadian male novelists
Canadian male dramatists and playwrights
20th-century Canadian dramatists and playwrights
20th-century Canadian male musicians
20th-century Canadian male writers
21st-century Canadian male writers